Hendersonville is a census-designated place located in Cecil Township, Washington County in the state of Pennsylvania.  The community is located just to the east of Interstate 79.  As of the 2010 census the population was 325 residents.

Demographics

References

Census-designated places in Washington County, Pennsylvania
Census-designated places in Pennsylvania